Anja Dittmer (born 22 September 1975 in Neubrandenburg) is a German professional triathlete. Dittmer is the only female member of the A-Team (ASICS Olympia Team) of the National Squad,  the only female four-time Olympian (Sydney 2000, Athens 2004, Beijing 2008 and London 2012), 1999 European Champion and 2006 European vice Champion.

In 2011, Dittmer joined the high performance military unit Sportfördergruppe Mainz and ranked as the sub officer (Stabsunteroffizier). She has studied Sports Management since 2003 and lives in Saarbrücken. Her club is Sportclub Neubrandenburg. 

In France, Dittmer takes part in the prestigious Club Championship Series Lyonnaise des Eaux and represents Charleville Tri Ardennes, the silver medalist in the French Club Championship Series 2011.

ITU Competitions 

Anja Dittmer was part of the world triathlete elite for almost 20 years. She took part in four Olympic Games with triathlon competitions, placing 15th (Sydney 2000), 11th (Athens 2004), 33rd (Beijing 2008) and 12th (London 2012) respectively.

In the 18 years from 1994 to 2011, Dittmer took part in 99 ITU competitions and achieved 60 top ten positions, as well as ten gold medals.
Dittmer's gold period, as it were, began in 1999, when she became European Champion, and lasted until 2008, when she was crowned Oceania Sprint Champion and won the European Cup at Schliersee.
At the age of 35 and 36 years, Dittmer conquered medal positions at highly competitive triathlons, e.g. at Tongyeong in 2010 (World Cup) and at London in 2011 (World Championship Series).

The following list is based upon the official ITU rankings and the ITU Athletes's Profile Page.
Unless indicated otherwise, the following events are triathlons (Olympic Distance) and refer to the Elite category.

DNF = did not finish · DNS = did not start · BG = the sponsor British Gas

References

External links
 
 
 
 
 
 

1975 births
Living people
People from Neubrandenburg
People from Bezirk Neubrandenburg
German female triathletes
Duathletes
Sportspeople from Mecklenburg-Western Pomerania
Olympic triathletes of Germany
Triathletes at the 2000 Summer Olympics
Triathletes at the 2004 Summer Olympics
Triathletes at the 2008 Summer Olympics
Triathletes at the 2012 Summer Olympics
Recipients of the Silver Laurel Leaf
German military personnel of the Bundeswehr
20th-century German women
21st-century German women